USS John Sealy (SP-568), also spelled John Sealey, was a United States Navy minesweeper in commission during 1917.

John Sealy was built as a commercial steam tug of the same name in 1910 at West Lake, Louisiana.  On 25 April 1917, the U.S. Navy acquired her from her owner, D. M. Picton, for use as a minesweeper on the section patrol during World War I. She was commissioned as USS John Sealy (SP-568).

After brief service as a minesweeper, John Sealy was returned to her owner on 10 August 1917.

Notes

References

SP-568 John Sealy at Department of the Navy Naval History and Heritage Command Online Library of Selected Images: U.S. Navy Ships -- Listed by Hull Number: "SP" #s and "ID" #s -- World War I Era Patrol Vessels and other Acquired Ships and Craft numbered from SP-500 through SP-599
NavSource Online: Section Patrol Craft Photo Archive: John Sealy (SP 568)

Minesweepers of the United States Navy
World War I minesweepers of the United States
Ships built in Louisiana
1910 ships